The Verein zur Vorbereitung der Autostraße Hansestädte–Frankfurt–Basel, commonly referred to as HaFraBa, was an organization dedicated to developing one of the first large Autobahn projects in Germany.

Foundation and name 
The association was founded on 6 November 1926 as "Verein zum Bau einer Straße für den Kraftwagen-Schnellverkehr von Hamburg über Frankfurt a.M. nach Basel" by Robert Otzen. On 31 May 1928 the association was renamed as the Verein zur Vorbereitung der Autostraße Hansestädte–Frankfurt–Basel to include the Hanseatic cities of Bremen and Lübeck into the planning. As the terms Hamburg and Hansestädte begin with the same letters the abbreviation HaFraBa could be maintained.

Planned motorways and toll 
Initial planning saw a motorway link from Hamburg to Hanover and from Frankfurt to Basel (and from Basel to Genoa) with later planning including Bremen and Lübeck. The plans almost matched the current Autobahn 5 and the Northern part of the Autobahn 7. In 1930, for each city, detailed plannings of the linkage to the Hafraba was presented in summaries subtitled "Städte an den Hafrabastraßen" by J. F. Amberger (Heidelberg), Adolf Elsaesser (director of urban planning of Mannheim), Theodor Krebs (Darmstadt), Maurer (Mainz), Rehorn (chief of traffic of Kassel) and Carl Thalenhorst (senator of building authorities of Bremen) in the newspaper Hafraba-Mitteilungsblatt.

As the government saw no need to this project, the HaFraBa planned to implement a toll system to provide financing. The calculations resulted in the following prices:

 one car including the driver: 3 Pfennig per kilometer
 each additional person: 1 Pfennig per kilometer
 one truck: 2 Pfennig per kilometer
 loading: 0.5 Pfennig per ton and per kilometer

At first, the project was rejected by the Nazis but after the takeover by Adolf Hitler, the plans where partially adopted when building Autobahn 5 and Autobahn 7. The name of the association was later changed to Gesellschaft zur Vorbereitung der Reichsautobahnen.

Literature

References

External links 
 Die vergessene Autobahn bei Hannover by Michael Grube on geschichtsspuren.de 
 Die Reichsautobahnen by Volker Wichmann 
 Geschichte des Autobahnbaus aus bayerischer Sicht by the Bavarian Ministry of the Interior 
 Working Papers in History of Mobility by Richard Vahrenkamp (University of Kassel) 
 

Autobahns in Germany
Roads in Hesse
Transport in Frankfurt